The 1986 Florida gubernatorial election took place alongside the midterm congressional elections. The Democratic Party won many victories across the country (including retaking the Senate). However, in Florida, where Democrats gained the Senate seat from Republicans, they lost the Governorship for just the second time since Reconstruction.

The primaries took place on September 2, the runoffs on September 30 and the general election on November 4, 1986.

Democratic nomination

Candidates
 Mark Kane Goldstein, former Mayor of Gainesville
 Harry Johnston, State Senator from West Palm Beach
 Steve Pajcic, State Representative from Jacksonville
 James C. Smith, Attorney General of Florida
 Joan Wollin, attorney

Republican nomination

Candidates
 Chester Clem, State Representative
 Louis Frey Jr., U.S. Representative
 Tom Gallagher, State Representative
 Bob Martinez, Mayor of Tampa

General election

References

1986
Gubernatorial
Florida